Huo Li (born 25 December 1980) is a Chinese cross-country skier. She competed in two events at the 2006 Winter Olympics.

References

External links
 

1980 births
Living people
Chinese female biathletes
Chinese female cross-country skiers
Olympic cross-country skiers of China
Cross-country skiers at the 2006 Winter Olympics
Place of birth missing (living people)
Cross-country skiers at the 2007 Asian Winter Games